The Ambassador from Israel to Portugal is Israel's foremost diplomatic representative in Portugal.

List of ambassadors
Dor Shapira 2021 - 
Raphael Gamzou 2017 - 2021
Tzipora Rimon 2013 - 2017
Ehud Gol 2009 - 2013
Aaron Ram 2004 - 2009 
Shmuel Tevet 2001 - 2004 
Yehiel Yativ 1997 - 2001
Benjamin Oron 1992 - 1997 
Kolet Avital 1988 - 1992
Joel Baromi 1984 - 1985
Dov Halevy-Milman 1981 - 1983
Efraim Eldar 1977 - 1981
Avraham Gilboa 1964 - 1967
Ambassador Levy Arye Alon 1962 - 1964
Consul General Shimon Amir 1960 - 1962

References

Portugal
Israel